South Carolina Highway 5 (SC 5) is a  primary state highway in the U.S. state of South Carolina. The highway, signed as north-south, travels in a northwest-southeast direction connecting the cities of Rock Hill, York and Blacksburg.

Route description

SC 5 begins with a semi-interchange with US 521 near Van Wyck. Going northwesterly nearly its entire route, it crosses the Catawba River entering York County.  In Lesslie, it joins U.S. Route 21 (US 21), crossing over Interstate 77 (I-77) before splitting in Rock Hill. Going southwesterly around the downtown area, it overlaps SC 121 (Albright Highway); then going northwesterly again in, overlapping with SC 901 (Heckle Boulevard).  SC 5 exits out of Rock Hill solo again towards York; where there, it joins SC 161 and bypasses northeasterly around the city. Continuing on its northwesterly direction, it reaches its final destination of Blacksburg, where it connects with US 29 before ending at I-85 (exit 102) and SC 198.

Speeds along the highway does not exceed , in both urban and rural areas.  The highway provides a direct route from both US 521 and I-85 to both York and Rock Hill.

History

Established as an original state highway, SC 5 originally traveled from SC 9 in Fort Lawn, through Rock Hill and York, to SC 8 in Blacksburg. In 1929 or 1930, SC 5 was extended south along new primary routing to SC 22 in Great Falls. In 1938, SC 5 was extended on both directions, connecting north to SC 18 and south to US 21 in Ridgeway.

In 1939, SC 5 reached its longest length with its last extension south along US 21 through Columbia.  Then continuing south, replacing parts of SC 3, SC 6 and SC 33, through Swansea, Denmark, Olar, and Fairfax, ending at US 17 in Hardeeville. It total length reached .

In 1950, SC 5 was truncated at US 21/SC 322 in Rock Hill; its old alignment between Rock Hill and Columbia becoming solely US 21 and from Columbia to Hardeeville becoming US 321. In 1951 or 1952, its alignment between York and Kings Creek was rerouted replacing SC 324 and part of SC 55; its old alignment becoming SC 91, SC 211 and SC 907.  In 1959, SC 5 was realigned onto a more direct routing between Rock Hill and York; its old alignment became part of SC 161 and SC 274.  Between 1960-1962, SC 5 was extended to its current southern terminus with US 521 near Van Wyck.  Between 1965-1967, US 21/SC 5 was given a freeway bypass around Lesslie, its old alignment becoming secondary road Lesslie Highway (S-46-6).

In 1986, SC 5 was rerouted on bypass northwest around York, its old alignment through downtown becoming SC 5 Business.  Around 2006-2009, SC 5 rerouted to its current northern terminus with I-85/SC 198 in Blacksburg; its old alignment was downgraded to secondary roads.  In 2013, SC 5 was rerouted southwest around Rock Hill, along Albright Road and Heckle Boulevard; its old alignment downgraded to city roads with only its northern section of Main Street, between Cherry Road and Heckle Boulevard, converting into a connector.

Major intersections

Special routes

Hardeeville alternate route

South Carolina Highway 5 Alternate (SC 5 Alt.) was an alternate route of SC 5 when the mainline existed in Hardeeville. It traveled between SC 5 (now US 321) and US 17/SC 46. It was established in 1939 and became part of SC 46 in 1947.

Rock Hill truck route

South Carolina Highway 5 Truck (SC 5 Truck) was a truck route that once provided an alternate route for truck drivers to bypass downtown Rock Hill, via SC 72 (Albright Road) and SC 901 (Heckle Boulevard).  In 2013, mainline SC 5 was rerouted from downtown Rock Hill and onto the truck route, thus eliminating it.

Rock Hill connector

South Carolina Highway 5 Connector (SC 5 Conn.) was established in 2013 when mainline SC 5 was rerouted west around downtown Rock Hill, via Heckle Boulevard; the connector route follows its old alignment on Main Street between SC 322 (Cherry Road) and SC 5/SC 901 (Heckle Boulevard). It is known as West Main Street, Veterans Memorial Highway, and Juanita Goggins Highway for its entire length.

It begins at an intersection with SC 322 (South Cherry Road) in the northwestern part of Rock Hill, which is in the east-central part of York County. It travels to the northwest and then curves to the west-northwest. A short distance later, it meets its northern terminus, an intersection with SC 5/SC 901.

York business loop

South Carolina Highway 5 Business (SC 5 Bus.) follows the old route of SC 5 through downtown York, via Liberty Street. It connects with US 321/SC 161 and US 321 Business. After traveling through the downtown area, it links to the northern terminus of SC 324 before eventually rejoining mainline SC 5 southeast of York.

See also

References

External links

 
 Mapmikey's South Carolina Highways Page: SC 5
 Mapmikey's South Carolina Highways Page: Former SC 5 Alt.
 Mapmikey's South Carolina Highways Page: SC 5 Business

005
Transportation in Lancaster County, South Carolina
Transportation in York County, South Carolina
Transportation in Cherokee County, South Carolina
Rock Hill, South Carolina